James D. Garrison is an American historian of literature, and currently the University Distinguished Teaching Professor at the University of Texas at Austin, as well as a published author.

References

Year of birth missing (living people)
Living people
21st-century American historians
American male non-fiction writers
University of Texas at Austin faculty
20th-century American non-fiction writers
University of California, Berkeley alumni
21st-century American male writers
20th-century American male writers